Omar Varela (15 October 1957 – 6 December 2022) was a Uruguayan actor, director, playwright, and teacher, the founder of the theater company Italia Fausta.

Biography
He directed plays and musicals such as Mi bella dama, Ópera do Malandro, and ¿Quién le teme a Italia Fausta? (with Petru Valensky, this masterpiece ran for more than 10 years). In addition, he was one of the founding pioneers of children's theater in Uruguay. He was a juror on the Teledoce talent show  during its 2014 and 2015 seasons.

Varela won the Iris Award in 2003.

Varela died from complications of Parkinson's disease on 6 December 2022, at the age of 65.

References

External links
 

1957 births
2022 deaths 
Deaths from Parkinson's disease
20th-century dramatists and playwrights
20th-century Uruguayan male actors
21st-century dramatists and playwrights
21st-century Uruguayan male actors
Male actors from Montevideo
Uruguayan dramatists and playwrights
Uruguayan educators
Uruguayan male stage actors
Uruguayan theatre directors
Male dramatists and playwrights
20th-century Uruguayan male writers
20th-century Uruguayan writers
21st-century Uruguayan male writers
21st-century Uruguayan writers